Oscar Tietz (18 April 1858 – 17 January 1923) was a Jewish-German businessman (Unternehmer).

He was born in Birnbaum/Warthe, Posen. The brother of Leonhard Tietz, and a nephew of Hermann Tietz, he joined his uncle's department store concern,  in Berlin, Tietz Department Store (Elberfeld).

Oscar Tietz died in Klosters, Switzerland at age 64.

Legacy 
When the Nazis came to power the departments stores the Tietz founded were Aryanized, that is forcibly transferred to non-Jewish owners. The Tietz department stores became part of Hertie, KaDeWe.

Postwar claims were filed by the Tietz family concerning the expropriation of property under the Nazis.

See also
 Leonhard Tietz
 Hermann Tietz
 Tietz Department Store (Elberfeld)

References

1858 births
1923 deaths
People from Międzychód
Businesspeople from Berlin
People from the Province of Posen
20th-century German businesspeople
German businesspeople in retailing